Hasanabad-e Zandi (also Romanized as Ḩasanābād-e Zandī; also known as Ḩasanābād) is a village in Koshkuiyeh Rural District, Koshkuiyeh District, Rafsanjan County, Kerman Province, Iran. At the 2006 census, its population was 313, in 69 families.

References 

Populated places in Rafsanjan County